The 2013 season was the San Diego Chargers' 44th in the National Football League (NFL), their 54th overall, and their first under head coach Mike McCoy. The Chargers finished the regular season with a record of 9–7, improving on their 7–9 record from 2012. Also, they qualified for the playoffs for the first time since 2009. The Chargers defeated the Cincinnati Bengals in the Wild Card round by a score of 27–10, but lost to the Denver Broncos in the Divisional round by a score of 24–17. This was the Chargers' final playoff appearance in San Diego. They did not play in the postseason again until 2018, after relocating to Los Angeles.

The new head coach, Mike McCoy, along with offensive coordinator Ken Whisenhunt, completed the Chargers' first winning season since 2010. Only two offensive coaches returned from 2012 in an overhauled coaching staff, and a revamped offensive system had quarterback Philip Rivers release the ball earlier and taking what opposing defenses conceded. Rivers was sacked 30 times, compared to 49 the previous year, and threw for 4,479 yards and 32 touchdowns while tying a career-high with a 105.5 passer rating. San Diego's rushing attack improved from the prior season's 1,461 yards and 3.6 yards per carry—tied for the second worst in the league—to 1,965 yards and a 4-yard average. Although they were speculated to have a poor, disappointing season, and getting off to a shaky start, the Chargers finished in the top eight of the overall standings. Rivers was named NFL Comeback Player of the Year, and Keenan Allen broke out into the national scene as a rookie sensation, breaking multiple wide receiver rookie records. Whisenhunt left at the conclusion of the season to become the head coach of the Titans.

Signings

Re-Signings

Departures

NFL Draft

Draft notes

Staff

Final roster

Schedule

Preseason

Regular season

Note: Intra-division opponents are in bold text.

Postseason

Game summaries

Regular season

Week 1: vs. Houston Texans

With the loss, the Chargers started their season 0–1.

Week 2: at Philadelphia Eagles

Week 3: at Tennessee Titans

Week 4: vs. Dallas Cowboys

Week 5: at Oakland Raiders

This game was moved to an 8:35 pm. PDT kickoff, and from CBS to NFL Network as a "special edition" of Thursday Night Football, as extended time was required to convert the field back from its baseball configuration due to an Oakland Athletics American League Division Series game the previous night.

Week 6: vs. Indianapolis Colts

Week 7: at Jacksonville Jaguars

Week 9: at Washington Redskins

Week 10: vs. Denver Broncos

Week 11: at Miami Dolphins

Week 12: at Kansas City Chiefs

Week 13: vs. Cincinnati Bengals

Week 14: vs. New York Giants

Week 15: at Denver Broncos

Week 16: vs. Oakland Raiders

Week 17: vs. Kansas City Chiefs

Kansas City missed a field goal as with a few seconds left to send the game into overtime, where Nick Novak kicked the game winner. With the win, the Chargers finished the 2013 season with a record of 9–7 and clinched the second wild card spot, becoming the 6th seed entering the playoffs.

Postseason

AFC Wild Card Playoff Game: at #3 Cincinnati Bengals

With the Chargers defeating the Bengals, 27–10, they recorded their first playoff victory since 2008 and advanced to the AFC Divisional Playoff Game.

AFC Divisional Playoff Game: at #1 Denver Broncos

With the Chargers falling to the Broncos, the Chargers finished the season 10–8, their first double-digit winning season since 2009.

Standings

Division

Conference

Footnotes

References

External links

San Diego
San Diego Chargers seasons
San Diego